Kustaa Kylänpää (24 October 1881 – 6 July 1961) was a Finnish Lutheran clergyman and politician, born in Rauma. He was a member of the Parliament of Finland from 1922 to 1924, from 1925 to 1929 and from 1936 to 1945, representing the National Coalition Party.

References

1881 births
1961 deaths
People from Rauma, Finland
People from Turku and Pori Province (Grand Duchy of Finland)
20th-century Finnish Lutheran clergy
National Coalition Party politicians
Members of the Parliament of Finland (1922–24)
Members of the Parliament of Finland (1924–27)
Members of the Parliament of Finland (1927–29)
Members of the Parliament of Finland (1936–39)
Members of the Parliament of Finland (1939–45)
Finnish people of World War II
University of Helsinki alumni